Good Together may refer to:

Music
Good Together (album), a 1989 album by A Certain Ratio 
 "Good Together" (song), a 2018 song by James Barker Band
 "Good Together", a song by Tom Aspaul from the EP Revelation
 "Good Together", a song by Honne from the album Warm on a Cold Night
 "Good Together", a song by Shy Martin
 "Good Together", a song by Scarlet Pleasure from the album Lagune
 "Good Together", a song by Kelvin Jones from the album Stop the Moment